Michael Stutchbury (born 4 May 1957) is the editor-in-chief of the Australian Financial Review and formerly The Australian economics editor. He generally writes from a free market viewpoint, and was critical of a number of the Rudd-Gillard Government's economic policies, particularly on its stimulus packages, and industrial relations.

Born in Melbourne, Stutchbury began his journalistic career with the Australian Financial Review. Later, he became a business editor of The Australian, and a Washington correspondent during the first term of the Clinton Administration, before becoming one of the longest-serving editors of The Australian.

He is the father of 2018 NSW Young Liberals President, Harry Stutchbury. In July 2018, Michael Stutchbury married Ticky Fullerton in the UK.

He occasionally appears on Insiders, the ABC's weekly program on political discussion.

References

1957 births
Living people
Australian journalists
The Australian journalists
Australian newspaper editors